The Buick Park Avenue is a full-size car built by Buick. The nameplate was first used in 1975 for an appearance option package on the Electra 225 Limited.  It became an Electra trim level in 1978 and its own model starting in the 1991 model year after the Electra was discontinued.

There were two generations of the Park Avenue that were manufactured in the United States until 2005. In 2007, the nameplate was revived on a large Buick sedan built by Shanghai GM for the Chinese market based on the Holden Caprice from the WM/WN range. The nameplate is derived from the affluent New York City boulevard, Park Avenue.

Electra Park Avenue (1975–1990)

1975-1976

Park Avenue first appeared as an appearance package on the 1975 Buick Electra Limited.  It included similar seats to the Cadillac Sixty Special, optional full center console, Buick 455ci V8, posi-traction, 15" rallye sport wheels, rear automatic leveling, optional leather, optional Air Cushion Restraint System, remote mirror with thermometer, and automatic climate control.  The 1976 cars were largely the same except for some styling revisions and added emissions systems.

1977-1984

Park Avenue, previously an appearance option package, became an official trim level on the Electra in 1978. Cosmetically, a different grille and redesigned tail lights were the only notable cosmetic changes that year but 1979 brought a redesigned, flat front end and a subtly different taillight treatment featuring a Buick crest and bisecting horizontal silver line. A more extensive redesign occurred for the 1980 model year.

1985-1990

Park Avenue remained the top trim on the Buick Electra, it was redesigned along with the rest of the Electra line up moving to the front wheel drive GM C-Body.  It featured upgraded upholstery/seating, premium sound, optional leather, and standard Buick 3800 V6.  The coupe version was discontinued in 1987.  For 1989, Buick introduced the Park Avenue Ultra trim level.  The Ultra was essentially an upgrade to the Electra Park Avenue line, and featured a standard leather interior with dual 20-way power front seats (shared with Cadillac's restyled 1989 Cadillac Fleetwood Sixty Special), lower-body accent exterior paint treatment, distinctive thick-padded vinyl top with limousine-style rear-window surround (available only on Ultra), simulated burled elm trim on the doors and instrument panel, unique aluminum wheels, anti-lock brakes, chromed B-pillar moldings, specific grille and tail lamps, leather-wrapped steering wheel, electronic instrumentation, padded glove-compartment door, unique interior door panel trim, and a variety of otherwise minor changes. With its long list of standard equipment, the Park Avenue Ultra carried a higher base price than Cadillac's Sedan de Ville. The Park Avenue Ultra did not gain much popular recognition, however, until the following generation of Park Avenue where the "Ultra" badge offered even more features.

Essence concept car

The Buick Park Avenue Essence was a concept car designed and engineered by the Buick division of General Motors to showcase advanced technology and styling. First shown in 1989 in a light green metallic color, the Essence made rounds through the auto show circuits later in a light white.  Inside the Essence was a wide, sweeping instrument panel that housed a prototype Delco Navicar navigation system among other innovations. Smooth, graceful body lines forecast the eventual production Park Avenue, introduced in 1990.  The Essence was powered by the then-new 165 hp version of Buick's 3800 OHV V6 engine.

First generation (1991–1996)

The 1991 Park Avenue, introduced in July 1990, used GM's C platform and was previewed by the 1989 Park Avenue Essence show car. Much of the Park Avenue's styling vocabulary made their way to subsequent Buick models restyled in the 1990s.  

The Park Avenue was Buick's largest front wheel drive sedan, but the even larger rear wheel drive Roadmaster returned to the line in 1991 for the station wagon and 1992 for the sedan. The largest Buick was the Roadmaster; its Park Avenue trim was the most luxurious and considered the flagship of the marque. 

This generation offered Dynaride, where an air compressor pressurized the rear Chapman Struts to maintain a level overall ride height, which included a dashboard emblem to the left of the steering column. The system was not available on vehicles equipped with Gran Touring Suspension.

The base model Park Avenue featured a 3.8 L naturally-aspirated V6 engine and velour interior, upgradeable to leather. Starting in 1992, the Ultra came with a 3.8 L Supercharged V6 engine and leather interior. The Park Avenue received various exterior and interior cosmetic changes, as well as powertrain updates, during this run.  Some of the new options and features added to the first generation included driver (and later passenger) airbags, dual zone climate control, traction control, and variable-effort steering (Ultra only).

Europe
The Park Avenue was available in Europe from 1991 until 1996 and varied from the North American version by featuring a truncated taillamps with separate amber turn signal indicators and red brake lamps, wider numberplate bezel, fitment of rear red fog lamps, headlamps with different lens pattern, white front side running markers, amber front turn signal indicators, side turn signal repeaters, "flagpole" external rear-view mirrors (mirrors on US version are fixed and do not turn), stronger seat belt and anchors, "softer" air bags, metric speedometer and gauges. They are to comply with the European regulatory and safety standards. This generation of the Park Avenue was the last Buick to be officially marketed by GM in Europe. This move was to reduce the "cluttered" model range that confused the European consumers. After 1996, Cadillac and Chevrolet remained the sole General Motors North American brands to be sold in Europe.

Second generation (1997–2005)

An updated Park Avenue was released in October 1996 as a 1997 model and was now built on GM's G platform; however GM chose to continue to refer to it as the C platform, but was stronger and more substantial than its predecessor.  This new generation was powered by updated Series II variants of the 3800 and as before, only Ultra models were supercharged.  The base trim featured a hood ornament while the Ultra had a less conspicuous tri-shield inset on the upper edge of the grille.  The base Park Avenue was the last USDM Buick to carry a factory hood ornament.

For 2001, the base model's cloth interior was dropped as an option in favor of now standard leather trim. Ultrasonic rear park assist was a new option that year as well.  For 2003, trademark Buick "Ventiports" returned on the Park Avenue Ultra along with a bolder grille that carried a larger monochromatic tri-shield badge in the center. New 17 inch wheels, a revised interior and revised instrument cluster were changed for the 2003 model year on the Ultra.

For 2005, the final model year in North America, base Park Avenues received a revised grille, and the previously Ultra-exclusive Ventiports.  Also, the rear fascia was redone across the model line with a prominent chrome bar above the license plate holder with an embossed Park Avenue script and amber turn signal flashers.

The last 3,000 of 7,000 Park Avenues carried Special Edition badging that featured the namesake script underneath a silhouette of the New York City skyline. 300 of these were painted with a special two-tone black-on-platinum finish. Production ended on June 18, 2004. The Park Avenue was discontinued after 2005 in the North American market and was replaced in 2006 by the Buick Lucerne.

Third generation (2007–2012)

In April 2007, General Motors reintroduced the Park Avenue nameplate in China on a luxury sedan that replaced the Buick Royaum. Like its predecessor, the vehicle is based on the Australian-built Holden Caprice (this time on the contemporary WM/WN generation), though, unlike the Royaum, it was assembled by Shanghai GM from CKD kits shipped from Holden's Elizabeth factory in South Australia. It is offered in five trim levels: 舒适型 (Comfort), 精英型 (Elite), 豪华型 (Luxury - 2.8 only), 旗舰型 (Flagship) and 旗舰版 (Ultimate - 2010 only)

The Park Avenue was powered by Australian-built versions of the GM High Feature engine. The standard engines were the 2.8 L LP1 and the 3.6 L LY7 engine available as an option on the Elite and Flagship models from 2007 to 2009. The engine control unit is a Bosch E77 32-bit ECM processor.

In 2010, only one engine option was offered, a 3 L SIDI (251 bhp) replacing the old 2.8 V6 and 3.6 V6 due to fuel consumption with the 2.8 litre engine rated at 11.4 litres per 100 kilometres (20.6 MPG US) and the 3.6 litre engine rated 11.6 litres per 100 kilometres (20.3 MPG US) respectively. The 3 litre engine was rated 10.9 litres per 100 kilometres (21.6 MPG US). The third-generation Park Avenue remained a China exclusive and was never offered by Buick in North America. A version of the car did eventually see release in the US market as the stripped down, rebadged Chevrolet Caprice PPV (Police Patrol Vehicle).

It was discontinued in China in October 2012.

References

External links

1991-1996 Buick Park Avenue: Overview
1997-2005 Buick Park Avenue: Overview
Buick official page: China

Park Avenue
Front-wheel-drive vehicles
Full-size vehicles
Sedans
Motor vehicles manufactured in the United States
Cars introduced in 1990
2000s cars
Park Avenue
Cars discontinued in 2012